From the night of 1 May 2014 until the early morning hours of 3 May a series of attacks occurred on the Bengali Muslims in Assam, a north-eastern state of India.  The perpetrator is unknown, but is suspected to be the National Democratic Front of Bodoland's Songbijit faction. Speculated to be revenge for not voting for the National Democratic Front in the Lok Sabha elections, the death toll reached 32.

Background
The Bodos are an indigenous community in Assam state of India. It is about 10% its population of 44 million people. Insurgency in Northeast India is ongoing for decades involving several rebel groups. In 2012, violence between Bodo tribal people and Bengali Muslims resulted in 108 deaths fueled by an Assam Police Constable  Mohibur Islam alisa Ratul. In India, Loksabha election is ongoing which will conclude its last phase on 12 May and the results will be declared on 16 May.

Attacks
Around 07:30 PM IST on 1 May, insurgents raided the Narsingbari village of Baksa district opening fire on a house, killing three women and injuring two others. The attackers had arrived on bicycles. On early hours of 2 May, another group of insurgents opened fire at three houses in Balapara village of Kokrajhar district, killing seven people. On the evening of the same day, another group killed 12 people and burnt down 30 thatched houses near Baksa's Manas National Park.

On 3 May, four suspected insurgents attacked police in the forest near Tezpur. Police fired in retaliation which killed two while two other escaped. Police also killed one more suspect in Udalguri district from whom they recovered a revolver and a hand grenade.

Investigation
Police arrested 22 people along with eight forest guards to investigate their involvement. The Assam government has decided to hand over the probe to National Investigation Agency.

Aftermath

Security measures
Due to the attack, several Bengali Muslims from Duramari and Dotoma region of Kokrajhar district fled their houses. Bodoland Territorial Council chief Hagrama Mohilary pacified the panicked people and promised them of security. Curfew was clamped in Kokrajhar, Baksa and Chirang districts and shoot-on-sight orders have been issued in Kokrajhar and Baksa.

Army stages out flag marches in sensitive areas of Kokrajhar and Baksa districts. Ten additional companies of Central Reserve Police Force were moved to the two districts. Strong action against National Democratic Font has been initiated by the home ministry of India.

Union Home Ministry deployed 43 companies of the Central Armed Police Forces while Defense ministry also deployed 15 columns of the Army comprising approximately 1,500 soldiers.

Responses
Chief minister of Assam, Tarun Gogoi reviewed the situation with top government officials. The opposition political parties blamed the Gogoi-led government in failing to protect lives despite intelligence alerts.

Prime Minister of India, Manmohan Singh condemned the attack and termed it as a cowardly attempt to spread fear and terror.

In a statement, the National Democratic Front of Bodoland (Songbijit) denied their involvement in the attack and claimed it was conspiracy by the state government to create communal friction between Bodos and Muslims.

Relatives of the killed urged the Chief minister Tarun Gogoi to provide affirmation of security for their lives and stalled the last rites for those dead. They also complained of pressure from local authorities to conduct funeral rites for the killed.

References

Attacks in 2014
Mass murder in 2014
2010s in Assam
Terrorist incidents in India in 2014
Anti-Muslim violence in India
Bodo nationalism
May 2014 events in India
May 2014 crimes in Asia
Massacres of Bengalis in Assam
Massacres of Bengalis